The Swedish Sports Awards is a show to honor the past year's Swedish sports and athletes' achievements. It is hosted annually at Ericsson Globe in Stockholm in mid or late January. The event was first held in the year 2000.

In the years 2021 and 2022, the event was held in Annexet instead, following the Coronavirus pandemic reducing the number of spectators.

Awards and winners

Sportswoman of the Year

Sportsman of the Year

Team of the Year

Coach of the Year

Newcomer of the Year

Performance of the Year

Lifetime Achievement Award

Sportsperson of the century

Svenska Spel and the Swedish Sportjournalist Federation's Grant

See also 
 Radiosportens Jerringpris
 Svenska Dagbladet Gold Medal

References 

Awards established in 2000
January events
National sportsperson-of-the-year trophies and awards
Sport in Sweden
Sport in Stockholm
Swedish sports trophies and awards